Greek cuisine (Greek: Ελληνική Κουζίνα) is the cuisine of Greece and the Greek diaspora. In common with many other cuisines of the Mediterranean, it is founded on the triad of wheat, olive oil, and wine. It uses vegetables, olive oil, grains, fish, and meat, including pork, poultry, veal and beef, lamb, rabbit, and goat. Other important ingredients include pasta (for example hilopites), cheeses, lemon juice, herbs, olives, and yogurt. Bread made of wheat is ubiquitous; other grains, notably barley, are also used, especially for paximathia. Common dessert ingredients include nuts, honey, fruits, and filo pastries. It continues traditions from Ancient Greek and Byzantine cuisine, while incorporating Ottoman, Balkan, and Italian influences.

History

Greek cuisine is part of the culture of Greece and is recorded in images and texts from ancient times. Its influence spread to ancient Rome and then throughout Europe and beyond.

Ancient Greek cuisine was characterized by its frugality and was founded on the "Mediterranean triad": wheat, olive oil, and wine, with meat being rarely eaten and fish being more common. This trend in Greek diet continued in Cyprus and changed only fairly recently when technological progress has made meat more available. Wine and olive oil have always been a central part of it and the spread of grapes and olive trees in the Mediterranean and further afield is correlated with Greek colonization.

The Spartan diet was also marked by its frugality. A notorious staple of the Spartan diet was melas zomos (black soup), made by boiling the blood of pigs with vinegar to prevent coagulation. This dish was noted by the Spartans' Greek contemporaries, particularly Athenians and Corinthians, as proof of the Spartans' different way of living.

Byzantine cuisine was similar to ancient cuisine, with the addition of new ingredients, such as caviar, nutmeg and basil. Lemons, prominent in Greek cuisine and introduced in the second century, were used medicinally before being incorporated into the diet. Fish continued to be an integral part of the diet for coastal dwellers. Culinary advice was influenced by the theory of humors, first put forth by the ancient Greek doctor Claudius Aelius Galenus. Byzantine cuisine benefited from Constantinople's position as a global hub of the spice trade.

Overview

The most characteristic and ancient element of Greek cuisine is olive oil, which is used in most dishes. It is produced from the olive trees prominent throughout the region, and adds to the distinctive taste of Greek food. The olives themselves are also widely eaten. The basic grain in Greece is wheat, though barley is also grown. Important vegetables include tomato, aubergine (eggplant), potato, green beans, okra, green peppers (capsicum), and onions. Honey in Greece is mainly honey from the nectar of fruit trees and citrus trees: lemon, orange, bigarade (bitter orange) trees, thyme honey, and pine honey. Mastic, an aromatic, ivory-coloured plant resin, is grown on the Aegean island of Chios.

Greek cuisine uses some flavorings more often than other Mediterranean cuisines do, namely oregano, mint, garlic, onion, dill, cumin, and bay laurel leaves. Other common herbs and spices include basil, thyme and fennel seed. Parsley is also used as a garnish on some dishes. Many Greek recipes, especially in the northern parts of the country, use "sweet" spices in combination with meat, for example cinnamon, allspice and cloves in stews.

The climate and terrain has tended to favour the breeding of goats and sheep over cattle, and thus beef dishes are uncommon. Fish dishes are common in coastal regions and on the islands. A great variety of cheese types are used in Greek cuisine, including Feta, Kasseri, Kefalotyri, Graviera, Anthotyros, Manouri, Metsovone, Ladotyri (cheese with olive oil), Kalathaki (a specialty from the island of Limnos), Katiki Domokou (creamy cheese, suitable for spreads),  Mizithra and many more.

Dining out is common in Greece. The taverna and estiatorio are widespread, serving home cooking at affordable prices to both locals and tourists. Locals still largely eat Greek cuisine.

Common street foods include souvlaki, gyros, various pitas and roast corn.

Fast food became popular in the 1970s, with some chains, such as Goody's and McDonald's serving international food like hamburgers, and others serving Greek foods such as  souvlaki, gyros, tyropita, and spanakopita.

Origins

Many dishes can be traced back to ancient Greece: lentil soup, fasolada (though the modern version is made with white beans and tomatoes, both New World plants), tiganites, retsina (white or rosé wine flavored with pine resin) and pasteli (candy bar with sesame seeds baked with honey); some to the Hellenistic and Roman periods: loukaniko (dried pork sausage); and Byzantium: feta cheese, avgotaraho (cured fish roe), moustalevria and paximadi (traditional hard bread baked from wheat, barley and rye). There are also many ancient and Byzantine dishes which are no longer consumed: porridge (chilós in Greek) as the main staple, fish sauce (garos), and salt water mixed into wine.

Some dishes are borrowed from Italian and adapted to Greek tastes: pastitsio (pasticcio), pastitsada (pasticciata), stifado (stufato), salami, macaronia, mandolato, and more.

Many Greek dishes are inherited from Ottoman cuisine, which combined influences from Persian, Levantine-Arabic, Turkish and  Byzantine cuisines: phyllo, tzatziki, yuvarlakia, eggplant papoutsaki, boureki, meze, dolma, pita bread, papoutsakia, baklava, kadaifi, halva, loukoumi, and more.

In the 20th century, French cuisine had a major influence on Greek cooking, largely due to the French-trained chef Nikolaos Tselementes, who created the modern Greek pastitsio; he also created the modern Greek version of moussaka by combining an existing eggplant dish with a French-style gratin topping.

Regions

Distinct from the mainstream regional cuisines are:
 Cuisine of the Aegean islands (including Kykladítiki from Kyklades, Rhodítiki from Rhodes and other Dodecanese islands, and the cuisine of Lesbos island)
 Cuisine of Argolis, cuisine of Patras, Arcadian and Maniot cuisines, parts of the Peloponnesean cuisine
 Cuisine of the Ionian islands (Heptanisiakí), a lot of Italian influence
 Ipirótiki (Epirotic cuisine)
 Kritikí (Cretan cuisine)
 Kypriakí (Cypriot cuisine)
 Makedonikí (Macedonian cuisine)
 Mikrasiatikí, from the Greeks of Asia Minor descent, including Polítiki, from the tradition of the Greeks from Constantinople, a cuisine with significant Anatolian/Ottoman influence
 Pontiakí, found anywhere there are Pontic Greeks (Greeks from the Black Sea region)
 Thrakiótiki (Thracian cuisine)

Some ethnic minorities living in Greece also have their own cuisine. One example is the Aromanians and their Aromanian cuisine.

Typical dishes

Typical home cooked meals include seasonal vegetables stewed with olive oil, herbs, and tomato sauce known as lathera. Vegetables used in these dishes include green beans, peas, okra, cauliflower, spinach, leeks and others. 

Many food items are wrapped in filo pastry, either in bite-size triangles or in large sheets: kotopita (chicken pie), spanakopita (spinach and cheese pie), hortopita (greens pie), kreatopita (meat pie, using minced meat), kolokythopita (zucchini pie) etc. In general, the Greeks do with filo what the Italians do with pasta; They have countless variations of pitas (savory pies).

Apart from the Greek dishes that can be found all over Greece, there are also many regional dishes.

North-Western and Central Greece (Epirus, Thessaly and Roumeli/Central Greece) have a strong tradition of filo-based dishes, such as some special regional pitas.

Greek cuisine uses seeds and nuts in everything from pastry to main dishes.

The list of Greek dishes includes dishes found in all of Greece as well as some regional ones.

See also

 Cypriot cuisine
 Greek-American cuisine
 Greek Macedonian cuisine
 Greek food products
 Greek restaurant
European cuisine

Citations

Further reading

External links